Miyanbag is a village in Shahganj, Uttar Pradesh, India.

References

Villages in Jaunpur district